Debabrata Mukherjee may refer to:
 Debabrata Mukherjee (cricketer)
 Debabrata Mukherjee (mountaineer)

See also
 Deb Mukherjee, Indian actor